The 2016 Aegon Ilkley Trophy was a professional tennis tournament played on outdoor grass courts. It was the second edition of the tournament for both men and women. It was part of the 2016 ATP Challenger Tour and the 2016 ITF Women's Circuit, offering a total prize money of €42,500 for men and $50,000 for women. It took place in Ilkley, United Kingdom, on 13–19 June 2016.

Men's singles main draw entrants

Seeds 

 1 Rankings as of 6 June 2016.

Other entrants 
The following players received wildcards into the singles main draw:
  Liam Broady
  Lloyd Glasspool
  Brydan Klein
  Jonny O'Mara

The following player received entry as a special exemption into the singles main draw:
  Marius Copil

The following players received entry from the qualifying draw:
  Matthew Barton 
  Daniil Medvedev 
  Adrián Menéndez-Maceiras
  Michał Przysiężny

Women's singles main draw entrants

Seeds 

 1 Rankings as of 6 June 2016.

Other entrants 
The following player received a wildcard into the singles main draw:
  Emily Appleton
  Ashleigh Barty (withdrew)
  Freya Christie
  Samantha Murray

The following players received entry from the qualifying draw:
  Jaimee Fourlis
  Ons Jabeur
  Sanaz Marand
  Rebecca Šramková

The following player received entry by a lucky loser spot:
  Alison Bai

The following player received entry by a protected ranking:
  Michelle Larcher de Brito
  Tereza Mrdeža

The following player received entry by a special exemption:
  Stéphanie Foretz

Champions

Men's singles

 Lu Yen-hsun def.  Vincent Millot, 7–6(7–4), 6–2

Women's singles
 
 Evgeniya Rodina def.  Rebecca Šramková, 6–4, 6–4

Men's doubles
 
 Wesley Koolhof /  Matwé Middelkoop def.  Marcelo Demoliner /  Aisam-ul-Haq Qureshi, 7–6(7–5), 0–6, [10–8]

Women's doubles
 
 Yang Zhaoxuan /  Zhang Kailin def.  An-Sophie Mestach /  Storm Sanders, 6–3, 7–6(7–5)

External links 
 2016 Aegon Ilkley Trophy at ITFtennis.com
 Official website

2016 ITF Women's Circuit
2016 ATP Challenger Tour
2016
2016 in English tennis
June 2016 sports events in the United Kingdom